The Chemours Company is an American chemical company that was founded in July 2015 as a spin-off from DuPont. It has its corporate headquarters in Wilmington, Delaware, United States.

History
In October 2013, DuPont announced that it was planning to spin off its "performance chemicals" business into a new publicly traded company in mid-2015. DuPont filed its initial Form 10 with the SEC in December 2014 and announced that the new company would be called "The Chemours Company." The name is a portmanteau of the words chemical and Nemours, a nod to DuPont's full name, E. I. du Pont de Nemours & Co. The company's CC ticker symbol, is also a play on DuPont's DD symbol.

The spin-off was completed on July 1, 2015, and Chemours' stock began trading on the New York Stock Exchange on the same date. 

Chemours has assumed various liabilities arising from lawsuits against DuPont. Additionally, Chemours' plant in Bladen County, North Carolina, was found to be dumping vast quantities of a chemical dubbed "GenX", a precursor of Teflon, into the Cape Fear River. This story is recounted in the 2018 documentary film The Devil We Know, which centers on Parkersburg, West Virginia, where the DuPont facility that manufactured Teflon was located. The documentary follows the personal stories and tribulations of several people who worked at the Parkersburg facility.

Products

Chemours manufactures and sells performance chemicals falling within three segments: Titanium Technologies (titanium dioxide); Fluoroproducts (refrigerants and industrial fluoropolymer resins and derivatives including Freon, Teflon, Viton, Nafion, ECCtreme ECA and Krytox); and Chemical Solutions (cyanide, sulfuric acid, aniline, methylamines, and reactive metals).

References

External links

 
 

 
Chemical companies of the United States
Manufacturing companies based in Delaware
Multinational companies headquartered in the United States
Companies based in Wilmington, Delaware
American companies established in 2015
Chemical companies established in 2015
2015 establishments in Delaware
DuPont

Companies listed on the New York Stock Exchange
Corporate spin-offs